Ya zhe yego lyubila ( / literally: I Loved Him - is a 2005 studio album of Sofia Rotaru, recorded at Artur Music in Ukraine. The album was released in the summer of 2005 in Ukraine first with 10 tracks. The album includes 3 earlier unreleased singles, one remastered song, and 6 songs aired previously on TV shows and Musicals.

Track listing

Languages of performance 
Songs are performed in Russian language.

References

External links 
 Official CD Discography of Sofia Rotaru
 "Fortuna" Fan Club

2005 albums
Sofia Rotaru albums